Publicity Madness is a 1927 American comedy film directed by Albert Ray and written by Andrew Bennison and Malcolm Stuart Boylan. The film stars Lois Moran, Edmund Lowe, E. J. Ratcliffe, James Gordon, Arthur Housman and Byron Munson. The film was released on October 2, 1927, by Fox Film Corporation, in a rush to capitalize on the publicity surrounding transatlantic flight of Charles Lindbergh.

Plot
Pete Clark (Edmund Lowe), advertising and publicity manager for the Henly soap manufacturing company, puts up $100,000 of the company's money for a promotional contest, but endangers his job, in the process.

After taking a "crash" cours eon aviation, Pete decides to enter the race himself so as to collect the prize money and save himself from disgrace.

After a series of amazing stunts, Pete does reach Hawaii and thereby wins the admiration of Violet (Lois Moran), the boss's daughter. He also saves his job.

Cast 
       
 Lois Moran as Violet Henly
 Edmund Lowe as Pete Clark
 E. J. Ratcliffe as Uncle Elmer Henly
 James Gordon as Brutus Banning
 Arthur Housman as Oscar Hawks
 Byron Munson as Henry Banning
 Norman Peck as Wilbur

Production
Aviation historian Michael Paris in From the Wright Brothers to Top Gun: Aviation, Nationalism, and Popular Cinema(1995) described the frenzy of trying to woo Lindbergh to do a film. Hollywood resorted to a spate of aviation-related features including Publicity Madness (1927), Flying Romeos (1928) and  A Hero for a Night, even the Walt Disney Studios' Plane Crazy (1928),  all comedy spoofs of the Lindbergh transatlantic flight.

Reception
The contemporary film review of Publicity Madness  in The New York Times, noted, "A typical strip of Hollywood's more respectable canned fun is now decorating the Hippodrome screen. It bears the title of 'Publicity Madness' and its principal ingredients are beauty, resourcefulness, impertinence and stupidity; these are mixed up with dashes of flying machines, a full-blown ocean and a special soap."

Aviation film historian Stephen Pendo, in Aviation in the Cinema (1985) noted Publicity Madness involved "high jinks" in the air.

References

Notes

Citations

Bibliography

 Paris, Michael. From the Wright Brothers to Top Gun: Aviation, Nationalism, and Popular Cinema. Manchester, UK: Manchester University Press, 1995. .
 Pendo, Stephen. Aviation in the Cinema. Lanham, Maryland: Scarecrow Press, 1985. .
 Wynne, H. Hugh. The Motion Picture Stunt Pilots and Hollywood's Classic Aviation Movies. Missoula, Montana: Pictorial Histories Publishing Co., 1987. .

External links
 
 

1927 films
American aviation films
1920s English-language films
Silent American comedy films
1927 comedy films
Fox Film films
Films directed by Albert Ray
American silent feature films
American black-and-white films
1920s American films
English-language comedy films